Megacyllene neblinosa is a species of beetle in the family Cerambycidae. It was described by Di Iorio in 1995.

References

Megacyllene
Beetles described in 1995